Farez Halabi (born 9 June 1957) is a Syrian boxer. He competed in the men's light welterweight event at the 1980 Summer Olympics.

References

1957 births
Living people
Syrian male boxers
Olympic boxers of Syria
Boxers at the 1980 Summer Olympics
Place of birth missing (living people)
Light-welterweight boxers